Elections to Bethnal Green Council were held on 1 November 1928. All the council seats were up for election. The term of office for each Councillor being three years.

Background
Following the decision of the Labour Party to expel Communist Party members from their party, in Bethnal Green, a number of their council group were expelled, including leading figure Cllr. Joseph James Vaughan. The Communist Party responded by fielding a full slate of candidates in opposition to Labour Party candidates. Bethnal Green Liberals decided to end their nominal Progressive alliance with the Municipal Reform Party and stand candidates for the first time under the Liberal Party label.

Summary
In the previous elections in 1925, the Labour Party had won 17 of the 30 council seats, giving it a majority of Councillors. In 1928 the Liberal Party swept the board winning all 30 council seats.

|}
Changes in seats from dissolution

Election result
* - Councillor seeking re-election

Comparisons are made with the 1925 election results.

East

Liberal gain 2 from Labour and 1 from Municipal Reform

North

Liberal gain 5 from Labour and 1 from Communist

South

Liberal gain 3 from Labour and 3 from Communist

West

Liberal hold 6

Aldermanic Elections

References

1928 English local elections
Bethnal Green Borough election
Bethnal Green Borough election